Big Bird in China is a 1983 television special based on the children's television series Sesame Street produced by Children's Television Workshop and China Central Television. It was originally broadcast on May 29, 1983, on NBC. Big Bird, Barkley and Little Xiao Fu travel through China to find Feng Huang, the Phoenix bird.

The production was released on VHS from Random House Home Video in 1987, and on VHS and DVD from Sony Wonder on February 10, 2004. Although the voice of Telly Monster was Brian Muehl, Martin P. Robinson re-dubbed Telly's lines for the 2004 VHS and DVD releases when Big Bird goes to China. Also, it lacks about a minute of the original production, in which Big Bird is looking for someone who speaks "American", though it can be seen on early VHS releases.

This television special had a sequel known as Big Bird in Japan.

Synopsis
The special starts in New York City's Chinatown, Manhattan, where Big Bird peeks at an old scroll with a picture of a beautiful phoenix on it. The shopkeeper explains that the phoenix is magical and lives in China. To find the phoenix, Big Bird will first have to find the four places pictured on the scroll and he exclaims, "Well, what a good thing it would be if a great big American bird went to meet that beautiful Chinese bird! I mean, she could tell me everything about China, and then I could come home and tell everybody here!" He sets out with Barkley on a boat and makes it to China.

Highlights include Chinese landmarks like the Great Wall of China and Beijing, Big Bird learning the "little duckling dance", and a song to teach Chinese words. A character called the Monkey King helps Big Bird and Xiao Fu on their quest. Meanwhile, Oscar the Grouch decides to try to dig his way to China from his trash can, but when he gets to China, he finds it boring and goes straight home.

As the credits roll, Big Bird and Barkley walk back in Chinatown, Manhattan, and Xiao Fu giggles one last time.

Origins
In his memoir, Caroll Spinney (the puppeteer who plays Big Bird and Oscar the Grouch) notes that he was inspired to pitch the special to Children's Television Workshop after visiting China on a tour with Bob Hope. This first trip was to film the Bob Hope on the Road to China, a two-hour NBC special airing September 16, 1979.  The special featured Big Bird, along with the likes of Shields and Yarnell and Mikhail Baryshnikov, with musical numbers by Peaches & Herb and Crystal Gayle.  It was produced by James Lipton.

Spinney devised the storyline and suggested locations for Big Bird in China. However, the program's credits do not acknowledge this and instead state, "Created by Jon Stone". Spinney also notes that, when filming on location in Beijing, Guilin, and Suzhou, he experienced much tension and difficulty due to animosity from Stone.

Cast
 Caroll Spinney as Big Bird and Oscar the Grouch
 Frank Oz as Bert, Cookie Monster and Grover
 Jerry Nelson as Two-Headed Monster #1, Oscar the Grouch (assistant) and Cookie Monster (assistant)
 Brian Muehl as Barkley and Telly
 Jim Henson as Ernie 
 Richard Hunt as Two-Headed Monster #2, Ernie (assistant) and Telly (assistant)
 Martin P. Robinson as Telly (DVD Version)
 Cheryl Blalock as Additional Muppet Performer
 Ed Christie as Additional Muppet Performer
 Ouyang Lianzi (Lisa Ouyang) as Xiao Foo
 Katherine Lakoski as the Singing Phoenix
 Lu Ja-Lin as the Dancing Phoenix
 Arabella Hong as the Shopkeeper
 Ting Bao-Yi and Wang Kwan-Wei as the Lion Dogs
 Hua Ziu Ping as the Storyteller
 Chou Yi-Ping, Liu Xio-Shen, Zhang Xin-Tien, Xu Tien-Ed, Quan She-Zhen, Li Jiang, Lu Fu-Hai and Wu Chi-Lian as the Monkey Kings (Sun Wukong)

Awards
 Won the 1983 Emmy for Outstanding Children's Program

Production
Lisa Ou, who played Xiao Foo, did not understand a single word of English when she acted her scenes. She memorized the sounds.

Film production took place in 3 cities: Beijing (the Great Wall, animal sculpture), Guilin (the Glass Chessboard, headless buffalo) and Suzhou (the storyteller).

Scenes at the Great Wall took place early morning around 4AM due to heavy tourism crowds.

Carroll mentioned in the 2013 documentary "Being Big Bird" that Lisa Ou learned all her lines one by one while filming. He would repeat the lines and she would repeating stating "she probably didn't know what she was saying but she was very smart." Carroll and Lisa Ou were also re-united for the documentary for the first time in about 30 years.

This is the only film Lisa Ou acted in.

References

External links
 
 Photo of Big Bird with Bob Hope from their 1979 special
 

1983 television specials
Sesame Street features
NBC television specials
1980s American animated films
1980s American television specials
Television episodes set in Beijing
Television episodes set in New York City
Adventure television films
Films directed by Jon Stone